The word limma or leimma (from Greek: λείμμα, leimma; meaning "remnant") can refer to several different musical intervals, whose only common property is their small size.
More specifically, in Pythagorean tuning (i.e. 3-limit):
The original Pythagorean limma, 256/243, a Pythagorean interval.
and in 5-limit tuning:
The 5-limit diatonic semitone, 16/15. Although closer in size to the Pythagorean apotome than to the limma, it has been so called because of its function as a diatonic semitone rather than a chromatic one.
The 5-limit limma (now a diesis), 128/125, the amount by which three just major thirds fall short of an octave.
The major limma, 135/128, which is the difference between two major whole tones and a minor third.

Intervals (music)